It's a Brad, Brad World is an American reality documentary television series on Bravo. The series debuted on January 12, 2012. On August 29, 2012, Bravo announced that the series has been renewed for a second season which debuted on March 6, 2013.

Premise
The series follows Brad Goreski as he breaks away from his career as the assistant of Rachel Zoe and establishes his solo career. Goreski is shown working with celebrity clients along with attempting to share his talents to other designers.

Cast
 Brad Goreski: Goreski, former style director for Rachel Zoe, was born and raised in Port Perry, Ontario, Canada and has lived in Los Angeles, California for the past nine years. During summer breaks while attending the University of Southern California, Brad interned at Vogue and W magazines. After graduating with a B.A. in Art History, Brad landed a position as the Vogue West Coast assistant. After a chance meeting with stylist Rachel Zoe, Brad began working for her in 2008 and was eventually featured in the popular series The Rachel Zoe Project. After three seasons on the show, Goreski parted ways with Zoe to pursue his own career as a stylist.
 Gary Janetti: Goreski's long-term boyfriend.
 Lindsay Myers:  Goreski's assistant and close friend.

Episodes

Series overview

Season 1 (2012)

Season 2 (2013)

References

External links

 Official website
 
 

2010s American documentary television series
2012 American television series debuts
2013 American television series endings
American LGBT-related reality television series
English-language television shows
Fashion-themed television series
Bravo (American TV network) original programming
2010s LGBT-related reality television series